Tashlinsky District is an administrative and municipal district (raion), one of the thirty-five in Orenburg Oblast, Russia. It is located in the southwest of the oblast. Its administrative center is the rural locality (a selo) of Tashla. Population: 25,281 (2010 Census);  The population of Tashla accounts for 27.9% of the district's total population.

References

Notes

Sources

Districts of Orenburg Oblast